Red Dwarf X is the tenth series of the British science fiction sitcom Red Dwarf. It was broadcast on UK television channel Dave between 4 October and 8 November 2012. There are six episodes and it was the first full series of Red Dwarf since 1999.

Production
In June 2010, Craig Charles, Chris Barrie and Hattie Hayridge reported plans to produce further series of Red Dwarf. although a subsequent article on the official Red Dwarf website emphasised that nothing had yet been confirmed. In January 2011, Robert Llewellyn confirmed on his website that a new series would be filmed in late 2011 and broadcast in 2012 on the digital channel Dave, although the channel's owners UKTV initially refused to comment, suggesting that a new series had not been officially greenlit. On 10 April 2011, a six-episode Red Dwarf "Series X" to be broadcast on Dave in autumn 2012 was officially announced. Doug Naylor confirmed the plans both on Twitter and at the Dimension Jump XVI convention, and Dave issued the announcement through its website.

Filming dates for the new series were announced on 11 November 2011, along with confirmation that the series would again be shot at Shepperton Studios in front of an audience. Principal filming began on 16 December 2011 and ended on 27 January 2012, and the cast and crew subsequently returned for six days filming pick-ups. On 4 May 2012 Howard Goodall, who had composed music for Red Dwarf from its beginning until series VII, was announced as composer of the score for Red Dwarf X. On 19 June 2012, the post-production process was completed and all 6 episodes were signed off ready for their broadcast in the following autumn.

Crew
The main crew for the series was announced by Broadcast Magazine on 23 August 2012.

 Commissioning editors: Jane Rogerson and Steve North
 Writer and director: Doug Naylor
 Producer: Charles Armitage
 Co-producer: Richard Naylor
 Production Executive: Roopesh Parekh
 Line producer: David Mason
 Executive producers: Doug Naylor and Charles Armitage
 Director of photography: Andy Martin
 Production designer: Michael Ralph
 Make-up designer: Magi Vaughan
 Costume designer: Howard Burden
 Post-production supervisor: Jackie Vance
 Miniature DoPs: Peter Talbot and Deane Thrussell

Returning characters and actors

The only returning characters and their actors are:

 Arnold Rimmer, played by Chris Barrie;
 Dave Lister, played by Craig Charles;
 The Cat, played by Danny John-Jules;
 Kryten, played by Robert Llewellyn.

Promotion
The first trailer for Red Dwarf X was released on 20 July 2012 on Dave's official Facebook page, and was followed by a new teaser released every following Friday until the series premiered. Red Dwarf X began airing on 4 October 2012. The show was also advertised on billboards throughout the UK, mainly near train stations.

Episodes

Broadcast
In Australia, Red Dwarf X was broadcast on ABC1 from 7 November 2012.

In New Zealand, Red Dwarf X was broadcast on BBC UKTV between January and February 2013.

In the United States, Red Dwarf X made its American broadcast debut on the PBS station KERA-TV in Dallas, Texas, in July and August 2013. The distributor announced plans to roll out the show to other American public broadcasting stations in 2014.

Home media
Red Dwarf X was released on Blu-ray and DVD in the United Kingdom on 19 November 2012, in Australia on 12 December 2012, and in the United States on 8 January 2013. A limited-edition DVD steelbook was released along with the standard DVD and Blu-ray; a different limited-edition steelbook Blu-ray, exclusive to Zavvi, was released on 25 April 2016.

In Japan, Red Dwarf X was released in a box set along with Back to Earth. The set was released on 3 February 2015.

References

External links
 
 
 
 

2012 British television seasons
Dave (TV channel) original programming